PrimeFaces is an open-source user interface (UI) component library for JavaServer Faces-based applications, created by Turkish company PrimeTek Informatics.

History
The initial development of PrimeFaces was started in late 2008. Predecessor of PrimeFaces is the YUI4JSF library, a set of JSF components based on YUI JavaScript library. YUI4JSF got cancelled  in favor of PrimeFaces in early 2009.

Since its release, PrimeFaces has been strongly supported by Oracle, particularly within the NetBeans world.

Release history

Features
 Over 100 UI components
 Ajax Framework
 Mobile UI Kit
 Push Framework
 Dialog Framework
 Client Side Validation
 Theme Engine
 Search Expression Framework

Books
Packt Publishing publish books on this technology.
 PrimeFaces CookBook (2013)
 PrimeFaces Starter (2013)
 PrimeFaces Beginner's guide (2013)
 Learning PrimeFaces Extensions Development (2014)
 PrimeFaces Blueprints (2014)
PrimeFaces Theme Development (2015)
PrimeFaces Cookbook - Second Edition (2015)

Videos
 Building an App UI with PrimeFaces (2014)
 Rapid Primefaces (2014)
Mastering PrimeFaces (2015)

See also 
 Other JSF component libraries
 RichFaces
 ICEfaces
 OmniFaces
 Apache MyFaces
 Tobago 
 Tomahawk
 Trinidad
 ADF Faces (part of ADF)

References

Jakarta Server Faces
Java enterprise platform
Java specification requests